Gonyaulacales is an order of dinoflagellates found in marine environments.

References

 
Dinoflagellate orders